Shreeves is a surname. Notable people with the surname include:

Geoff Shreeves, British sports reporter
Peter Shreeves (born 1940), Welsh footballer and manager

See also
Shreeve (surname)